Burmeisterella is a genus of trilobites in the order Phacopida. It was described by Reed in 1918.

Species
 Burmeisterella annata (Burmeister, 1843)
 Burmeisterella armata
 Burmeisterella armata armata (Burmeister, 1843)
 Burmeisterella armata westrami (Dohm, 1909)
 Burmeisterella braziliensis Da Gloria Pipes De Carvalho, 2005
 Burmeisterella delattrei (Pillet & Waterlot, 1983) (= Burmeisterella vixarmata Wenndorf, 1990 according to Van Viersen & Taghon, 2020)
 Burmeisterella neoelongata Basse, 2007 (replacement name for elongatus Salter, 1865)
 Burmeisterella quadrispinosa Wenndorf, 1990
 Burmeisterella subarmata (Koch, 1883)

References

External links
 Burmeisterella at the Paleobiology Database

Devonian trilobites of Europe
Phacopida genera